Tibert Pont (born 23 January 1984) is a Swiss footballer who plays for Stade Nyonnais in the Swiss Promotion League.

References

External links

Swiss men's footballers
Swiss Super League players
Servette FC players
1984 births
Living people
People from Vevey
Association football midfielders
Sportspeople from the canton of Vaud